Sphaenorhynchus planicola, the Rio lime treefrog, is a species of frog in the family Hylidae.

Its natural habitats are swamps with deep water (>50 cm). It lives in floating vegetation; the eggs are laid on a leaf surface above the water. It can also live in cattle ponds with deep water. It is a very common species, but drainage of its habitat and pollution are threats.

References

planicola
Endemic fauna of Brazil
Amphibians of Brazil
Amphibians described in 1938
Taxa named by Adolfo Lutz
Taxa named by Bertha Lutz
Taxonomy articles created by Polbot